Mohamed Chaïb (born 20 May 1957) is an Algerian former football defender who played for Algeria in the 1986 FIFA World Cup. He also played for RC Kouba.

Doping mystery
In November 2011 Chaïb, who had three disabled daughters, and other of his World Cup Finals teammates called for an investigation into whether their children's disabilities had in any way to do with medication ordered to them by Algeria's Soviet coach Evgeni Rogov.

References

External links
FIFA profile

1957 births
Algerian footballers
Algeria international footballers
Association football defenders
RC Kouba players
1984 African Cup of Nations players
1986 African Cup of Nations players
1986 FIFA World Cup players
Competitors at the 1979 Mediterranean Games
Mediterranean Games bronze medalists for Algeria
Mediterranean Games medalists in football
Living people
21st-century Algerian people
20th-century Algerian people